Bids for the Asian Games is the process where National Olympic Committees select from within their national territory cities to put forward bids to host an Asian Games.

List of Asian Games bids

List of Asian Winter Games bids

List of Asian Youth Games bids

Notes

References

 
Bids
Multi-sport events bids